The UD Condor (kana:UD・コンドル) is a line of cabover medium-duty commercial vehicles produced by Nissan Diesel (now UD Trucks), introduced in 1975, Compact models sold under the Nissan Diesel Condor brand and rebranded Nissan Atlas.

Most mid-size and larger models of the truck are distinguishable by a front 'Condor' badge, but the common Nissan Diesel or UD badge is usually used on the rear.

In the United States, it is sold as a UD followed by a four-digit numeral indicating its load capacity, Its principal competitors are the Bering MD, Mitsubishi Fuso FM, Chevrolet W-Series, GMC W-Series, and Isuzu F-Series. Its Japanese market competitors are the Mitsubishi Fuso Fighter, Isuzu Forward, and Hino Ranger. In 2011 a new generation Condor MK/LK was introduced, which used the UD name in all markets, rather than Nissan Diesel.



First generation (1975–1983)
 

The first Condor appeared in 1975. Two types of engine were available: ED6 (a swirl chamber) and FD6T (a direct injection, with turbo). The turbo model is referred to as the "Condor GF"; it is equipped with power steering standard. In 1979 the base engine changed from ED6 to FD6 due to emissions regulations; the cab design was also revised.

Second generation (1983–1993)
The second generation Condor launched in 1983 following emissions compliance. In 1988, minor changes were made to the grille, the Condor S was added, and in 1989 anti-lock brakes were added.

In the United States, this generation was sold as the UD 1800-3300 but it was also imported by Navistar International and sold as the International Model 400, 500, 600, 700, and 900. The heaviest Model 900, a Class 7 truck, corresponds to the UD 3300.

Third generation (1993–2011)

In 1993, the third generation of the Condor range was introduced as the Fine Condor, and in 1994 it added a 4WD package. Minor changes included exhaust emission regulations in 1994 and in 1995 the Condor SS ultra-lightweight specifications was added. In addition, the CNG vehicles on its Condor range, and soon after, in 1997 it added PW (with 10 tons) and a short cab Condor Z, does similar to Condor S  is out of print and accordingly. Also the same year, it adopted shock-absorbing steering. Low-floor 4WD was also added.

In January 2000, an Allison 5-speed automatic transmission became available. The 9- and 12-ton versions were replaced in 2010, with the other models continuing to be built for another year.

Fourth generation (2010–2017)

In April 2010 the 8 ton class model PK series was announced, following the name change to UD Trucks in February 2010. It was introduced in Japan, with plans to sell in the US and other markets.

Engine options are the 4.6 L GH5 and the 7.0 L GH7

On 23 August 2010, the 9-ton PK series and 12-ton PW series were introduced while other models continued within the third generation.

Fifth generation (2017-present)

On 28 July 2017, as part of its transition from UD Trucks to Isuzu, the fifth generation Condor was introduced. It is now a rebadged version of the Isuzu Forward, with unique front fascia and new cab.

Lineup

Japan
CM
MK215 hh
LK
PK
PW
CPB87N
CMF87L
SP215NSB

US & Canada
UD 1300
UD 1400
UD 1800
UD 2000
UD 2300, DH, LP
UD 2600
UD 2800
UD 3000
UD 3300

See also
UD Trucks

References

External links

 Nissan Diesel Condor Homepage

Diesel Condor
Cab over vehicles
UD trucks
Vehicles introduced in 1975